For Those About to Rock (We Salute You) (referred to as For Those About to Rock on its cover) is the eighth studio album by Australian hard rock band AC/DC. It was released on 20 November 1981 for the United States, 27 November 1981 for the United Kingdom, 7 December 1981 for Australia and 19 December 1981 for Japan.

The album is a follow-up to their highly successful album Back in Black. For Those About to Rock has sold over four million copies in the US. It would be AC/DC's first and only No. 1 album in the U.S. until the release of Black Ice in October 2008. In their original 1981 review, Rolling Stone magazine declared it to be their best album. In Australia, the album peaked at No. 3 on the Kent Music Report Albums Chart.

The album, recorded in Paris, was the third and final AC/DC collaboration with producer Robert John "Mutt" Lange. The album was re-released in 2003 as part of the AC/DC Remasters series.

Releases
The album was re-released in 1985 on CD format mastered by Barry Diament from the original master tapes. In 1994 it was reissued after being digitally remastered from the original master tapes by Ted Jensen at Sterling Sound, N.Y.C.

Reception

For Those About to Rock became the first AC/DC album to ever hit No. 1 in the US on the Billboard chart and stayed on the top for three weeks.  To date, in the US, it has achieved  sales. In the UK, the album's two singles, "Let's Get It Up" and "For Those About to Rock (We Salute You)", made it to No. 13 and No. 15, respectively. The album has sold an estimated seven million copies worldwide, making it one of the highest sold AC/DC albums worldwide. However it marks a major drop-off in sales in the United States, only selling 4 million as follow-up to the 25× platinum Back in Black.  In a 2008 Rolling Stone cover story, David Fricke singled out the title track for praise, noting its "unusual stop-start effect that hooks you just as hard as their usual railroad drive."

Track listing

According to the official AC/DC website, the second track is "Put the Finger on You", while on some versions of the album the title is shown as "I Put the Finger on You".

References in popular culture
 In the movie School of Rock, Dewey Finn (Jack Black) says to the class: "In the words of AC/DC: We roll tonight ... to the guitar bite ... and for those about to rock ... I salute you".
 The concert video For Those About to Rock, about the first open-air rock concert in Moscow in 1991, was named after the album and title track, and featured live performances by AC/DC and other rock bands, including the title track.
 In the 1989 Beastie Boys single "Shadrach", they make a reference to the album in a lyric.
 American nu metal band Slipknot used the title track as their intro during the Knotfest 2019, 2021 and 2022 tour

Personnel
AC/DC
 Brian Johnson – lead vocals
 Angus Young – lead guitar
 Malcolm Young – rhythm guitar, backing vocals
 Cliff Williams – bass guitar, backing vocals
 Phil Rudd – drums

Production
 Robert John "Mutt" Lange – production
 Mark Dearnley – recording engineer
 Dave Thoener – mixing engineer
 Andy Rose, Mark Haliday & Nigel Green – assistant engineers
 Bob Ludwig – mastering at MasteRdisk (1981)
 Ted Jensen – remastering at Sterling Sound (1994)
 George Marino – remastering (2003)
 Al Quaglieri & Mike Fraser – remastering supervision (2003)

Charts

Weekly charts

Year-end charts

Certifications

References

1981 albums
AC/DC albums
Albert Productions albums
Atlantic Records albums
Albums produced by Robert John "Mutt" Lange